Southwest Magnet High School, also known as Southwest-Macon and Southwest Magnet High School and Law Academy, is a high school in Macon, Georgia, United States, serving students in grades 9–12. It is a unit of the Bibb County School System.

Notable alumni

 Milt Cuyler, former professional baseball player (Detroit Tigers, Boston Red Sox, Texas Rangers); current Hitting Coach of the Gulf Coast Twins
 Terry Fair (1960–2020), American-Israeli professional basketball player
 Jeff Malone, professional basketball player
 Norm Nixon, professional basketball player
 Sharone Wright, professional basketball player

References

External links
 

Public high schools in Georgia (U.S. state)
Magnet schools in Georgia (U.S. state)
Schools in Macon, Georgia